Charles Nagel (August 9, 1849 – January 5, 1940) was a United States politician and lawyer from St. Louis, Missouri. He was Secretary of Commerce and Labor during President William Howard Taft's administration (1909–1913) and was one of the key founders of the United States Chamber of Commerce.

Life and career
Nagel was born on August 9, 1849, in Colorado County, Texas, the son of Friedericke (Litzmann) and Hermann Nagel. Nagel moved to a boarding school in St. Louis, Missouri, for high school and stayed to study law at Washington University Law School. He graduated with his law degree in 1872. Nagel furthered his education by traveling to Europe and learning political economy at the University of Berlin.

Returning to St. Louis in 1873, Nagel joined the state bar and began to practice law. He was a member of the firm Finkelnburg, Nagel and Kirby, and later of Nagel and Kirby. His first foray into politics came when he won election to the Missouri House of Representatives in 1881, where he served until 1883. He was president of the St. Louis city council from 1893 to 1897. He also taught at St. Louis Law School (1885–1909) and was a member of the Republican National Committee (1908–1912).

Nagel was a corporate attorney for Adolphus Busch when President William Howard Taft chose him, in 1909, as Secretary of Commerce and Labor, a position he held until the end of the Taft administration in 1913. He was the last person to serve in the post before it was separated to two cabinet positions, Secretary of Commerce and Secretary of Labor. While heading the Department of Commerce and Labor, Nagel made it more accessible to the needs of businessmen while also expanding the Bureau of Immigration and Naturalization.

Nagel was also a founder of the United States Chamber of Commerce. Following his time in the cabinet, Nagel returned to the practice of law, arguing before the Supreme Court three times before his death. He died in St. Louis, Missouri on January 5, 1940, and was interred there in Bellefontaine Cemetery.

Family
Nagel was married twice: first, in 1876, to Fannie Brandeis, the sister of Louis Dembitz Brandeis, later a Supreme Court justice. She died in 1889 and he married Anne Shepley in 1895. He had six children, including Charles Nagel, Jr., an architect and curator.

Sources

 Charles Nagel at The Political Graveyard

External links
 Charles Nagel papers (MS 364). Manuscripts and Archives, Yale University Library.

|-

1849 births
1940 deaths
Burials at Bellefontaine Cemetery
Republican Party members of the Missouri House of Representatives
Missouri lawyers
American people of German descent
Politicians from St. Louis
Judges of the Supreme Court of Missouri
Taft administration cabinet members
20th-century American politicians
United States Chamber of Commerce people
United States Secretaries of Commerce and Labor
Washington University School of Law alumni
Washington University in St. Louis faculty
Lawyers from St. Louis